The Reid ministry (Free Trade) was the 4th ministry of the Government of Australia. It was led by the country's 4th Prime Minister, George Reid. The Reid ministry succeeded the Watson ministry, which dissolved on 17 August 1904 after the Protectionist Party withdrew their support and Chris Watson was forced to resign. Due to having to rely on the Protectionists to retain office, half of the ministry was forced to accommodate conservative Protectionists - leading to the government to sometimes be referred to as the Reid-McLean Ministry. The ministry was replaced by the Second Deakin ministry on 5 July 1905 after the Protectionists withdrew their support and returned to office with the support of the Labour Party.

James Drake, who died in 1941, was the last surviving member of the Reid ministry; Drake was also the last surviving minister of the Barton government and the First Deakin ministry. Sir Josiah Symon was the last surviving Free Trade minister.

Ministry

Notes

References

Ministries of Edward VII
Australian Commonwealth ministries
1904 establishments in Australia
1905 disestablishments in Australia
Cabinets established in 1904
Cabinets disestablished in 1905